Gioia Bruno (born Carmen Gioia Bruno June 11, 1963, sometimes professionally credited as just Gioia) is an Italian-born American popular music singer, most noted as a member of the vocal group Exposé.
In September 2006, Bruno temporarily stopped touring as a solo artist.

Personal life
Bruno has been married and divorced two times. From her first marriage, to Joseph Pastore, she has a daughter, Brianna Pastore, who was born in 1988. In January 2006, Gioia acknowledged that she is bisexual.

Discography

Albums
 Shelter (Lead Vocals, by the group Wet) 1996
 Expose This 2004
 '' A GIOIAful Christmas 2013

Singles

References

External links

1963 births
American hi-NRG musicians
Bisexual singers
Bisexual songwriters
Bisexual women
American LGBT singers
American LGBT songwriters
American LGBT rights activists
Living people
People from Bari
Exposé (group) members
Italian LGBT singers
Italian LGBT songwriters
American women in electronic music
20th-century American women singers
20th-century American singers
21st-century American women singers
American bisexual writers